Westport is a town in the Canadian province of Newfoundland and Labrador. The town had a population of 185 in 2021, down from 195 in the Canada 2016 Census.

Demographics 

See also
List of lighthouses in Canada
 List of cities and towns in Newfoundland and Labrador

References

External links
The Westport of Westports
Westport - Encyclopedia of Newfoundland and Labrador, vol.5, p.540-541.
 Aids to Navigation Canadian Coast Guard
 

Towns in Newfoundland and Labrador
Lighthouses in Newfoundland and Labrador